George Lamond (born George Garcia, February 25, 1967), sometimes styled George LaMond, is an American freestyle music and salsa music singer.

LaMond has released seven albums (five via Sony Music) between 1989 and 2014. Best known for his 1989 #25 Billboard debut, "Bad of the Heart", and his #1 salsa smash, "Que Te Vas" (which spawned an RIAA-certified Gold album). He also had a 2008 Top 5 radio hit, "Don’t Stop Believin’".

Early life
Lamond was born George Garcia in the Georgetown neighborhood of Washington, D.C. He moved to his parents' native Puerto Rico at age 2. He remained in Puerto Rico until the age of 7, at which point the family (which included eight other siblings) returned to the contiguous U.S., settling in The Bronx, where he primarily grew up.

Career
In 1989 Lamond's debut single "Bad of the Heart" was released on the indie label, Ligosa Records. "Freestyle", as the song was quickly labeled, was a subgenre of dance/pop music whose origins go back to the early 80s in the Latino communities of New York City. By the mid-to-late 80s, freestyle would cross over to non-Latinos with support by Anglo radio stations across the U.S. with artists such as Shannon, Expose, Lisa Lisa, The Cover Girls, and Stevie B.

The sales buzz of the single, "Bad of the Heart" and Lamond's signature vocals quickly caught the attention of Columbia Records/Sony Music, and George was signed to a major recording deal. His debut album, also titled Bad of the Heart, pushed the single to its peak at #25 on the Billboard Hot 100 and also included a string of successful follow-up singles: "Without You", "Look Into My Eyes" and "No Matter What", the third of which is a duet with Brenda K. Starr, which reached the Top 50 of Billboard.

Lamond enjoyed an opening slot on the North American leg of the ‘New Kids On The Block’ tour, playing stadiums throughout the U.S. He would go on to cover the NKOTB hit "Baby, I Believe in You" on his next album, releasing the tune as the album's second single.

In 1992, In My Life, Lamond's sophomore album was released, bolstered by the lead single, "Where Does That Leave Love", which quickly charted high. The album contained a solid mix of freestyle and pop along with a couple ballads, all intended to further build his name within mainstream music. However, national pop radio, at the time, was going thru a seismic shift, with a heavy R&B influence. By the Spring, 1993 release of the album's third and final single, "I Want You Back", a remake of the Jackson 5 classic featuring a then-relatively unknown Marc Anthony on backing vocals, Lamond was no longer a priority as far as promotion, and he would subsequently be dropped from Columbia Records.

Later in 1993, Lamond released his third album, and his first Spanish-language album, Creo En Ti, via Sony Discos, spawning two Top 15 Billboard Latin Singles, "Baby, Creo En Ti" and "No Morira", the latter of which featured featuring Lisa Lopez. However, label support at Sony Discos ceased once Columbia Records ended his contract.

Touring continued well into the late 1990s.  In 1998 Timber! / Tommy Boy records re-released "Without You 98" with various remixes by Willie Valentin. In 1999, while high-profile Latin music stars such as Ricky Martin and Marc Anthony engineered successful crossovers to the mainstream Anglo world, Lamond did just the opposite by returning to his roots to record salsa music in Spanish. His fourth album, Entrega (Prestigio/Sony Discos), went RIAA-certified gold. The album was bolstered by the smash lead single, "Que Te Vas", which peaked at #23 on Billboard's Hot Latin Songs chart and #6 on Billboard's Latin Tropical/Salsa Airplay chart.

Also in 1999, The Hits and More, Lamond's fifth album was released on Robbins Entertainment, containing a collection of his former Anglo hits along with new material. The album included a special appearance by K7 as well as freestyle producer, Carlos "After Dark" Berrios, along with Lamond's long-time producer, Chris Barbosa.

In late 1999, Lamond was approached by producer Robert Clivilles, to be a part of a male group project for Sony Music Japan. Lamond accepted the offer, and over the next six months, Urban Society, as the group would later be named, recorded a full-length album with Lamond's vocals. It was the first time Lamond ever recorded a completely pop album. Due to contract issues with Sony Japan, the album's Asian release was delayed several times until it was ultimately shelved.

In 2001, Lamond released his sixth album, GL, his sophomore salsa album, which reached #15 on Billboard's Tropical/Salsa Albums chart. The first single, "Jurare Quererte", peaked at #20 on Billboard's Latin Tropical/Salsa Airplay chart. The follow-up single, "Volver Amar", peaked at #35 on Billboard's Latin Tropical\Salsa Airplay chart.

Mid 2000s
As the Latin music business, in particular, began to recover in the mid-2000s, largely due to the rise of reggaeton, Lamond released his seventh studio album, Oye Mi Canto, in 2006 on Sony International.

In 2008, after a hiatus from recording, a producer-friend, Giuseppe D, presented Lamond the idea to release a dance-pop cover of Journey's song "Don't Stop Believing". Released on Robbins Entertainment, Lamond's cover reached #1 on New York's 103.5 KTU radio. The release also found success on other U.S. radio stations, especially in the Northeast and Canada. WKTU presented Lamond with a Lifetime Achievement Award in 2009.

On October 24, 2014, at Resorts World Casino in New York City, Lamond performed in a 25th anniversary show, in which he debuted new English and salsa material from a forthcoming album slated for early 2015.

Personal life
Lamond lives in Staten Island with his three sons.

Discography

Albums
 Bad of the Heart (1990, Columbia Records)
 In My Life (1992, Columbia Records)
 Creo En Ti (1993, Sony International)
 Entrega (1999, Sony Records)
 The Hits And More (1999, Robbins Entertainment)
 GL (2001, Sony International)
 Oye Mi Canto (2006, Sony International)

Singles
"Without You" (1989, Columbia Records)
"Bad Of The Heart" (1990, Columbia Records, US #25)
"Look into My Eyes" (1990, Columbia Records, US #63)
"No Matter What" - duet with Brenda K. Starr (1990, Columbia Records, US #49)
"Love's Contagious" (1991, Columbia Records)
"Where Does That Leave Love?" (1992, Columbia Records, US #59)
"Baby, I Believe In You" (1992, Columbia Records, US #66 - originally recorded by New Kids on the Block; features a sample of "(They Long to Be) Close to You" by The Carpenters)
"I Want You Back" (1993, Columbia Records - cover of the Jackson 5 hit song)
"Baby, Creo En Ti" (Sony Discos)
"No Morira" - duet with Lisa Lopez (Sony Discos)
"It's Always You" (1994, Tommy Boy Records)
"Without You" (1998, Tommy Boy Records)
"Earn My Love" (Robbins Entertainment)
"Que Tu Te Vas" (1999, Sony Discos)
"Entrega" (1999)
"Lately" (2000, Robbins Entertainment)
"Jurare Quererte" (2001)
"Volver Amar" (2001)
"Raspa" (2006, Sony Discos)
"Don't Stop Believin'" (2008, Robbins Entertainment)
"Something About You" (2009)
"Bringing My Love Down" (2013)

See also

 French immigration to Puerto Rico
 List of Puerto Ricans
 Nuyorican
 Puerto Ricans in New York City

References

External links
Official Website

American male singers
American male pop singers
American freestyle musicians
American salsa musicians
Columbia Records artists
People from the Bronx
Puerto Rican people of French descent
Living people
1967 births
Spanish-language singers of the United States